Pam Golding (née Stroebel; 12 September 1928 – 3 April 2018) was a South African real estate developer. Pam Golding Properties, which she founded in 1976, is one of the largest real estate groups in South Africa, with over 300 offices in sub-Saharan Africa and overseas. Golding's son, Andrew Golding, is currently the company's CEO. Golding died 3 April 2018, aged 89, at her home in Cape Town, South Africa.

References

1928 births
2018 deaths
People from Cape Town
South African businesspeople
White South African people